Babino is a rural locality (a village) in Ternovskoye Rural Settlement, Ternovsky District, Voronezh Oblast, Russia. The population was 70 as of 2010. There are 3 streets.

References 

Rural localities in Ternovsky District